Gösta Hjalmar Liljequist (1914–1995) was a Swedish meteorologist.

In Sweden, radio broadcast weather forecasts begun in 1926, and, starting in 1941, Liljequist was one of the recurrent meteorologists appearing in Swedish radio for many years.  Following his debut, his peculiar dialect caused mass protests which, together with an attack published by the humorist Kar de Mumma in the paper Svenska Dagbladet, caused broadcast forecasts to be taken over by Swedish public service radio during the war.

After the war, Liljequist took part in the Norwegian-British-Swedish Antarctic Expedition (NBSAE) (1949-1952).  During the expedition he became the first to observe a rare type of halo, an optical phenomenon subsequently named Liljequist parhelia after him.

During his life Liljequist wrote several books related to his field, besides textbooks on climatology and meteorology also overviews of Swedish polar history and research.

Bibliography 
 Arktisk utpost: Berättelsen om den svensk-finsk-schweiziska expeditionen till Nordostlandet 1957-1958, 1960
 Antarctica, 1960 (together with Emil Schulthess)
 Meteorologi, 1962
 Klimatologi, 1970
 Jordens klimat, 1975
 Moln - deras uppkomst och formationer, 1979
 Sweden and Antarctica, 1985
 High Latitudes - A History of Swedish Polar Travels and Research 1758-1980, 1993

References 

1914 births
1995 deaths
Swedish meteorologists
Members of the Royal Swedish Academy of Sciences